John Gilbert Bestall, (24 June 1900 – 11 April 1985) was an English international footballer, he also played top-division football and captained Grimsby Town, and later managed Doncaster Rovers and Blackburn Rovers.

Rotherham County and Rotherham United
Bestall made his debut for Rotherham County towards the end of the 1924–25 season, playing the last two games. County finished bottom of Division Three (North) that season and merged with Rotherham Town to form the new club, Rotherham United, that took the place of County in Division Three (North) for 1925–26.

Jackie was an ever-present in the 1925–26 season and in scoring 12 goals he was instrumental in producing much better fortunes. He playing in the first 17 games of the 1926–27 season before being sold shortly before an FA Cup tie at Lincoln City to Grimsby Town due to financial difficulties.

Grimsby Town
Bestall is regarded as "perhaps the greatest name on Town's roll-call – a diminutive craftsman full of guile and possessed of outstanding constructive qualities". He had a lounge at Blundell Park and the smallest road in Grimsby and Cleethorpes named after him.

Bestall captained Grimsby to the 1933–34 Second Division title and back into the First Division after two seasons in the Second. This helped Bestall to earn his only England cap aged 34 years, 226 days against Northern Ireland on 6 February 1935. He is the sixth oldest player to make his England debut and was the first Grimsby player to be capped by England.

He played in Grimsby's first FA Cup semi-final against Arsenal, but was injured early in the game, which Arsenal won 1–0. Grimsby Town fans believed that Bestall was targeted by the Arsenal defenders in the hope of deliberately injuring him.

Bestall played 427 league games for Town, only ever beaten by Keith Jobling and latterly John McDermott.

After retirement
When Bestall retired he had numerous jobs in football, coaching at Birmingham City and chief scout, chief scout at Doncaster Rovers, managing Blackburn Rovers and two spells as manager of Doncaster.

In tribute to his career at Grimsby Town, the town named a street after him.

Honours

Grimsby Town
Second Division Champions: 1934

References

External links

Feature on Blackburn Rovers website

1900 births
Footballers from Sheffield
1985 deaths
English footballers
Association football inside forwards
England international footballers
Rotherham County F.C. players
Rotherham United F.C. players
Grimsby Town F.C. players
English football managers
Blackburn Rovers F.C. managers
Doncaster Rovers F.C. managers
English Football League players
English Football League representative players
Beighton Miners Welfare F.C. players
People from Beighton, Sheffield
Footballers from Derbyshire